Verdades ocultas (English title: Hidden Truths) is a Chilean telenovela produced by AGTV Producciones and Chilefilms, starring Marcela Medel, Camila Hirane, Carmen Luz Zabala, Javiera Díaz de Valdés, Viviana Rodríguez, Matías Oviedo, Carlos Díaz León and Mauricio Pesutic. It aired on Mega from July 24, 2017 to June 22, 2022.

It is the longest-running telenovela on Chilean television.

Series overview

Cast

Main 
 Camila Hirane as Rocío Verdugo Flores / Martina Benavente Merino
 Solange Lackington as Rocío Verdugo Flores (alias: Ana Merino)
 Carmen Zabala as Agustina Mackenna Guzmán / Olivia Tapia Mackenna
 Catalina Guerra as Agustina Mackenna Guzmán
 Matías Oviedo as Tomás Valencia Fernández / Cristobel Valencia Mackenna 
 Cristián Campos as Tomás Valencia Fernández
 Gabriel Urzúa as Benjamín Valencia Verdugo
 Cecilia Cucurella as María Luisa Guzmán 
 Mabel Farías as Eliana Zapata
 Remigio Remedy as Ricardo San Martín Marín 
 Cristián Arriagada as Diego Castillo Hurtado / Gaspar Inostroza
 Felipe Castro as Diego Castillo Hurtado
 Javiera Díaz de Valdés as Samantha Müller Pérez / Julieta Müller Pérez
 Alejandra Fosalba as Samantha Müller Pérez
 Maricarmen Arrigorriaga as Leticia Hurtado
 Constanza Araya as Natalia
 Rocío Toscano as Roxana Núñez
 Marcela Medel as Laura Flores
 Osvaldo Silva as Rodolfo Mackenna
 Alejandro Trejo as Genaro Silva
 Mauricio Pesutic as Mario Verdugo
 Renato Munster as José Soto
 Nicolás Saavedra as Rafael Silva
 Santiago Tupper as Alonso Toledo
 Carmen Gloria Bresky as Gladys Núñez / Raquel Núñez
 Claudia Hidalgo as Viviana Leiva
 María de los Ángeles García as Maite Soto
 Ricardo Vergara as Franco Soto
 Macarena Teke as Nadia Retamales
 Norma Norma Ortiz as Maruja Pérez
 Teresita Reyes as Gabriela Marín
 Nicolás Brown as Eduardo Fuentes
 Antonia Giesen as Paula Fuentes
 Luna Martinez as Claudia Cárdenas
 Dominique Jimenez as Sofía Walker Cárdenas
 María Jesús Miranda as Javiera Diez Barraza
 Cristián Carvajal as Samuel Diez
 María José Necochea as María Angélica Barraza
 Renato Jofré as Gonzalo Verdugo Flores
 Mauricio Flores as Juan Francisco Rodríguez
 Beltrán Izquierdo as Cristobel Tapia (born Tomas "Tomasito" Valencia Mackenna)
 Stefan Platz as Benjamin Valencia Verdugo 
 Juan Falcón as Francesco Leone
 Antonia Bosman as Julieta Müller Pérez 
 Katty Kowaleczko as Gracia Pérez 
 Alexander Solórzano as José Luis Rodríguez 
 Viviana Rodríguez as María Luisa Guzmán
 Francisca Gavilán as Eliana Zapata
 Julio Jung Duvauchelle as Ricardo San Martín Marín
 Emilio Edwards as Nicolás Walker 
 Carlos Díaz León as Leonardo San Martín Marín (aliases: Lucas Montalbán/Matias del Santo/Javier Briceño/Andrés Benavente)

Recurring 
 Julio Milostich as Pedro Mackenna
 Paula Sharim as Isabel Guzmán
 Begoña Basauri as Muriel Droguett
 Paulina Eguiluz as Gloria Zúñiga
 Khaled Darwich as Sebastián Mackenna Guzmán
 María Angélica Luzzi as Teresa
 Lorena Prada as Olga Valdés
 Ester Müller as Belma
 Benjamín Hidalgo as Marcial
 Carlos Martínez as Dr. Gustavo Lama
 Bárbara Ríos as Sonia
 Catalina Vera as Marisol Sánchez
 Clara Larraín as Valentina Urrutia 
 Claudia Tapia Mendoza as Laura Flores (in flashbacks)
 Cristian Soto Marabolí as Pedro Mackenna (in flashbacks)
 Alondra Valenzuela as Agustina Mackenna Guzmán (in flashbacks)
 Sofía García as María Luisa Guzmán (in flashbacks)
 Catalina Silva as Isidora Undurraga
 Carlos Briones as Jairo
 Catalina de la Cerda as Florencia
 Jorge Denegri as Isidora's father
 Hernán Contreras as Emilio Velásquez
 Felipe Jaroba as Gendarme Miguel
 Romeo Singer as Rafael's doctor
 Bárbara Mundt as Jueza''
 Cristián Alegría as Pedro Mackenna's lawyer
 Julio César Serrano as Agustina Building Concierge
 Joaquín Emilio as spiritual master
 Julia Ibarz as Alba
 Ale Paredes-Rosales as Inés
 Seide Tosta as Renata

Awards and nominations

References

External links 
 

2017 Chilean television series debuts
2022 Chilean television series endings
2017 telenovelas
Chilean telenovelas
Mega (Chilean TV channel) telenovelas
Spanish-language telenovelas
Television shows filmed in Chile
Television shows filmed in Spain
Television shows filmed in Switzerland
Television shows filmed in Italy